The 1500 metres speed skating event was part of the speed skating at the 1936 Winter Olympics programme. The competition was held on Thursday, 13 February 1936. Thirty-seven speed skaters from 15 nations competed.

Medalists

Records
These were the standing world and Olympic records (in minutes) prior to the 1936 Winter Olympics.

(*) The record was set in a high altitude venue (more than 1000 metres above sea level) and on naturally frozen ice.

Charles Mathiesen set a new Olympic record with 2:19.2 seconds.

Results

References

External links
Official Olympic Report
 

Speed skating at the 1936 Winter Olympics